Coatetelco may refer to:

Coatetelco, Morelos, a town in Mexico
Coatetelco archaeological site, in Morelos, Mexico